WASU-LP (92.7 FM) is a radio station licensed to Albany, Georgia, United States.  The station is currently owned by Albany State University. WASU's studios are located at The Broadcast Center inside the Mass Communication Department in the Billy C. Black building on the East Campus of ASU, and the transmitter is located nearby.

References

External links
 

Albany State University
ASU-LP
ASU-LP
ASU-LP
Radio stations established in 2003
2003 establishments in Georgia (U.S. state)